The 2020 Italy men's OQT basketball team will represent Italy at the 2020 FIBA Men's Olympic Qualifying Tournament in Belgrade, Serbia in June 2021. They were qualified for the Qualification tournament by taking the 10th place at the 2019 FIBA Basketball World Cup. The team has been coached by Meo Sacchetti.

Overview 
The tournament was originally scheduled to take place from 23 to 28 June 2020, but it was shifted to 29 June to 4 July due to the COVID-19 pandemic.
Italy won the competition after an historic victory in the finals against the favourite Serbian team. This way, the Italian team qualified to the 2020 Summer Olympics in Tokyo.

Timeline 
 23–28 June 2020: Original Olympic Qualifying Tournament schedule
 13 June 2021: Coach Romeo Sacchetti calls 16 players for the tournament.
 29 June–4 July 2021: Rescheduled Olympic Qualifying Tournament
 28 June 2021: Coach Romeo Sacchetti calls the 12 players for the tournament.
 30 June 2021: Italy wins by forfeit against Senegal due to COVID detected in the African team. Italy is, therefore, automatically qualified to the next stage.
 1 July 2021: Italy wins over Puerto Rico 90–83 and ends the round at the first place.
 3 July 2021: Italy wins over Dominican Republic 79–59 and goes to the Final against Serbia.
 4 July 2021: Italy wins over Serbia 102–95 and qualifies to the 2020 Summer Olympics.

Kit 
Supplier: Spalding / Sponsor: Barilla

Roster 
The following 12 players were called by coach Romeo Sacchetti for the Olympic Qualifying Tournaments.

Depth chart

Candidate players 
The following were candidates to make the team:

Staff 
After the EuroBasket 2022 qualification tournament the staff team was updated: Piero Bucchi, Paolo Galbiati and Riccardo Fois were hired as assistant coaches and replaced Massimo Maffezzoli and Paolo Conti. Only Emanuele Molin was confirmed amongst the assistant coaches.

Source:

Exhibition games

VTG Supercup

Tournament

Preliminary round

Senegal v Italy 
The Senegal roster did not participate in the Qualifying Tournament. On June 28, they informed FIBA about COVID-19 related disruptions to their preparations in Germany. Afterwards, their scheduled games did not take place and Senegal lost by forfeit 0–20.

Italy v Puerto Rico

Final round

Italy v Dominican Republic

Serbia v Italy

Statistics

Individual statistics

Individual game highs 

Notes
  at least 5 attempts

Team game highs

References

External links

Italy men's OQT basketball team profile on FIBA

Basketball at the 2020 Summer Olympics – Men's qualification
2021